J. Q. Preble was a small publisher which was based in New York City. They published several children's books from 1851 to 1865.  Many of these books have detailed wood engravings.  The publisher often did not put publication dates or author names in the books.

Selected works

 ''Gift of Piety; or, Divine Breathings. - n.d.
 The Wonders of a Toy Shop. - n.d. 185? 
 Blackberry Girl by Nancy Sproat - c. 1840
 The history of the children in the wood - c. 1855
 Lilly of the Valley, or Cousin Lill's Stories for Her Pets. - c. 1855 
 The Little Robinson Crusoe. - 1855
 Fairy tales for children. Susie Sunbeam. - 1859 
 Stories about insects. Susie Sunbeam. - 1859

References

Defunct book publishing companies of the United States